Route 107 or Highway 107 can refer to multiple roads:

Canada
 New Brunswick Route 107
 Nova Scotia Highway 107
 Prince Edward Island Route 107
 Quebec Route 107

China
  China National Highway 107

Costa Rica
 National Route 107

India
 National Highway 107 (India)

Japan
 Route 107 (Japan)

Philippines
 N107 highway (Philippines)

United Kingdom
 The A107 road in London

United States
 Alabama State Route 107
 Arkansas Highway 107
 California State Route 107
 Connecticut Route 107
 Florida State Road 107 (pre-1945) (former)
 Georgia State Route 107
 Illinois Route 107
  Indiana State Road 107 (former)
 Iowa Highway 107
 K-107 (Kansas highway) (former)
 Kentucky Route 107
 Louisiana Highway 107
 Maine State Route 107
 Maryland Route 107
 Massachusetts Route 107
 M-107 (Michigan highway)
  Minnesota State Highway 107
 Missouri Route 107
 Nebraska Highway 107 (former)
 New Hampshire Route 107
 New Hampshire Route 107A
 County Route 107 (Ocean County, New Jersey)
 New Mexico State Road 107
 New York State Route 107
 County Route 107 (Fulton County, New York)
 County Route 107 (Nassau County, New York)
 County Route 107 (Onondaga County, New York)
 County Route 107 (Orange County, New York)
 County Route 107 (Seneca County, New York)
 County Route 107 (Steuben County, New York)
 County Route 107 (Suffolk County, New York)
 County Route 107 (Tompkins County, New York)
 County Route 107A (Tompkins County, New York)
 North Carolina Highway 107
 Ohio State Route 107
 Oklahoma State Highway 107 (1956–1961) (former)
 Oklahoma State Highway 107 (1972–1981) (former)
 Oklahoma State Highway 107 (1995–2000) (former)
 Pennsylvania Route 107
 Rhode Island Route 107
 South Carolina Highway 107
 Tennessee State Route 107
 Texas State Highway 107
 Texas State Highway Loop 107
 Texas State Highway Spur 107 (former)
 Farm to Market Road 107
 Utah State Route 107
 Vermont Route 107
 Virginia State Route 107
 Virginia State Route 107 (1923-1928) (former)
 Virginia State Route 107 (1928-1933) (former)
 Virginia State Route 107 (1933-1953) (former)
 Washington State Route 107
 West Virginia Route 107
 Wisconsin Highway 107

Territories
 Puerto Rico Highway 107
 U.S. Virgin Islands Highway 107

See also
D107 road (Croatia)
P107
R107 road (Ireland)